Rajović (r̩ajɔˈʋitɕ) is a Serbian and Montenegrin surname that may refer to:

Boban Rajović, Montenegrin pop singer
Milorad Rajović, Serbian footballer
Zoran Rajović, Serbian footballer
Blažo Rajović, Montenegrin footballer
Marko Rajović, Serbian footballer
Sanja Rajović, Serbian female handballer

Serbian surnames